Beautiful Noise is a 2014 American music documentary film, written and directed by Eric Green. The film documents three rock bands—Cocteau Twins, The Jesus and Mary Chain, and My Bloody Valentine—and their influence on shoegazing and other alternative rock genres. Beautiful Noise features extracts from over 50 interviews with bands and artists, as well as archival footage and music videos.

Green commenced production on Beautiful Noise in early 2005 with producer and editor Sarah Ogletree; production was largely completed by 2008 although the project stagnated due to various financial and legal issues. In response, Green began a successful crowdfunding campaign on Kickstarter in hopes of securing final financial investment for the film's release. The campaign was supported by several of the bands featured in Beautiful Noise through social media.

Beautiful Noise was announced for release in May 2014 and premiered at the Seattle International Film Festival in Seattle, Washington on May 31, 2014.

Overview
Beautiful Noise documents the underground music movement in the United Kingdom in the late 1980s and early 1990s, focusing in particular on the Scottish ethereal/dream pop band Cocteau Twins, Scottish noise pop band The Jesus and Mary Chain and the Irish alternative rock band My Bloody Valentine. The film explores "how their groundbreaking music inspired generations of bands", including shoegazing artists Ride, Slowdive, Chapterhouse, and Lush. Beautiful Noise features extracts from over 50 interviews with members of various bands, as well as "special appearances" from The Flaming Lips vocalist–guitarist Wayne Coyne, Nine Inch Nails frontman Trent Reznor, Billy Corgan of The Smashing Pumpkins and Robert Smith of The Cure.

In addition to interviews, Beautiful Noise includes never-before-seen footage, television appearances, music videos and tour projections of the film's featured bands. The film also "highlights new bands influenced by [shoegazing]", such as A Place to Bury Strangers, Wild Nothing and M83.

Production
Beautiful Noise was written and directed by Eric Green, produced and edited by Sarah Ogletree and presented by their studio company HypFilms. Green conceived the idea for the project in late 2004 after concluding that there were "a million documentaries about the Beatles, punk [and] rap" but no similar documentaries about bands he was a "longtime fan" of. Pre-production of Beautiful Noise began in early 2005 and by March, Green and Ogletree had commenced production on the film. Green's interviews with the film's featured cast "spanned over several years".

In 2007, an email was leaked to a journalist about Beautiful Noise. Several prominent publications, including The Guardian, NPR and Pitchfork Media reported on the film and "inspired a wider of level of interest" from the public. As a result, Green and Ogletree began a crowdfunding campaign on Kickstarter to raise finances to cover licensing of the music featured in the film, as well as clearances and distribution. Green hoped to raise $75,000  on Kickstarter and the campaign was supported by various artists raising awareness via social media. The project was successfully funded on December 16, 2012 and a further $9,740 was pledged after a total of 1,511 users contributed.

During early stages of production, from 2005 to 2007, Ogletree edited various versions of Beautiful Noise from rough scripts provided by Green. Multiple edits of the film featured archival footage with "personally custom designed art" which was the result of collaborations with artist Angus Cameron. Medicine founder Brad Laner also contributed a musical score to the film. Following public awareness of the film after the 2007 email leak, John Nugent and Timothy O'Donnell contributed further artwork to the film, presented alongside Cameron's additions. A final edit of Beautiful Noise was completed by Ogletree after Green's successful campaign on Kickstarter.

Release
Beautiful Noise was originally set for release in 2008. Green and Ogletree attempted to find a distributor, however several factors—including the expense of music clearance and licensing, the financial crisis of 2007–08 and the general decline in DVD sales—prompted "an ever-elusive" release date. Upon starting the campaign on Kickstarter, Green mentioned an estimated release date in 2013, although delays in licensing affected the appraisal. Beautiful Noise was subsequently announced for release in May 2014; the film premiered at the Seattle International Film Festival in Seattle, Washington on May 31 and the international premiere was held at the Sheffield Doc/Fest in Sheffield, England on June 8.

References

Bibliography

External links

 at Kickstarter

2014 documentary films
2010s musical films
2014 films
Alternative rock
American documentary films
American independent films
American rock music films
Cocteau Twins
Rockumentaries
Kickstarter-funded documentaries
My Bloody Valentine (band)
Shoegaze
The Jesus and Mary Chain
2010s English-language films
2010s American films